Stefano Hatfield is a British journalist and newspaper editor. He was born in Croydon and was educated at The John Fisher School and the University of Exeter. He is a Roman Catholic of Italian descent.

Hatfield edited thelondonpaper and Campaign, before his appointment as executive editor of The Independent in 2010  with responsibility for the other national daily in the group, the then new i, In 2013, he left i to become editorial director of the London Live news and current affairs TV station owned by Evgeny Lebedev, also proprietor of The Independent.

References

Alumni of the University of Exeter
British male journalists
British newspaper editors
I (newspaper) journalists
Living people
Place of birth missing (living people)
Year of birth missing (living people)
British newspaper journalists